This is a list of Indian High Commissioners to Kenya. India has a relatively large diplomatic network, reflecting its links in the world and particularly in neighboring regions: Central Asia, the Middle East, East Africa, Southeast Asia and the Indian subcontinent. There are also far-flung missions in the Caribbean and the Pacific, locations of historical Indian diaspora communities.

As a Commonwealth country, Indian diplomatic missions in the capital cities of other Commonwealth member states are known as High Commissions. In other cities of Commonwealth countries. India calls some of its consulates "Assistant High Commissions".

List of High Commissioners of India to the Republic of Kenya
The current High Commissioner is Dr. Virandar Paul.

References

Kenya
India and the Commonwealth of Nations
India–Kenya relations
Kenya and the Commonwealth of Nations
India